Rhegmatophila is a genus of moths of the family Notodontidae erected by Gustav Standfuss in 1888. It consists of the following species:

 Rhegmatophila alpina Bellier, 1881
 Rhegmatophila ricchelloi Hartig, 1939
 Rhegmatophila vinculum Hering, 1936

References

Notodontidae